Trinkle is a surname. Notable people with the surname include:

Elbert Lee Trinkle (1876–1939), American politician and 49th Governor of Virginia
Jeff Trinkle, American computer scientist
Ken Trinkle (1919–1976), American baseball player

See also
Trinkle Mansion, a historic building in Wytheville, Virginia, United States
24204 Trinkle, a main-belt asteroid